Coon Lake is a lake in Anoka County, Minnesota, in the United States.  Coon Lake was named from the fact the lakefront area was a popular hunting ground of raccoons.

References

Lakes of Minnesota
Lakes of Anoka County, Minnesota